The Suzuki B-King is a streetfighter style motorcycle manufactured by Suzuki,
that was unveiled in 2007.
It uses the same  engine that is fitted to the second generation 2008–onwards Hayabusa, but with different exhaust and intake systems.

The B-King was originally revealed in 2000 as a concept show bike powered by a supercharged Hayabusa engine.

References

External links 
 Suzuki B-King official site

B-King
Standard motorcycles
Motorcycles introduced in 2007